The Apo Kayan people are one of the Dayak people groups that are spread throughout Sarawak of Malaysia, East Kalimantan and North Kalimantan of Indonesia. The earliest Apo Kayan people are from the riverside of the Kayan River, Bulungan Regency, East Kalimantan, Indonesia. According to the Apo Kayan Dayak legend, the Kayan people are the forefathers of which all smaller sub-ethnic Dayak people that are found along the Kayan River came from. Today, the population of the Apo Kayan people are estimated about 64,900.

Sub-ethnic

The Apo Kayan people group are divided into 3 sub-ethic Dayak people, namely:-
 Kayan people (Borneo)
 Kenyah people
 Bahau people
From the 3 sub-ethnic Dayak people group, they are further divided into 60 smaller sub-ethnic groups that are spread across 60 settlements that are located in Kalimantan and making them the smallest of the sub-ethnic group (Sedatuk) that still retain their family genealogy.

Kenyah people
The Kenyah Dayak people comprises 24 smaller sub-ethnics:-

 Kenyah
 Kenyah Bauh
 Lepo Payah
 Uma Klap
 Nyibun Saban
 Lepo Maut
 Ma Long
 Ma Alim
 Lepo Ko
 Ma Badang
 Ulun Nerau
 Ulun
 Lepo Tau
 Lepo Jalan
 Lepo Bam
 Lepo Tukung
 Lepo Aga
 Lepo Bakung
 Baka
 Lepo Lepo
 Lepo Lisan
 Lepo Kayan
 Ngure / Urik
 Lepo Kulit

Kayan people
The Kayan Dayak people are divided into 10 smaller sub-ethnics:-

 Uma Pliau
 Uma Puh
 Uma Samuka
 Uma Naving
 Uma Lasung
 Uma Daru
 Uma Paku
 Uma Bawang
 Uma Juman
 Uma Leken

Bahau people
The Bahau Dayak people are made of 26 smaller sub-ethnics:-

 Saputan
 Pnihing
 Kayan
 Long Glat
 Ma Suling
 Long Mai
 Uma Lohat
 Hwang Ana
 Hwang Tring
 Segai
 Modang
 Melarang
 Ma Belur
 Ma Lowang
 Ma Aging
 Na Pagung
 Ma Bau / Uban
 Uvan Dali
 Bahau
 Uwabg Hurai
 Uvang Mekan
 Uvang Boh
 Uvang Sirap
 Uma Mehak
 Uma Teliba
 Tunjung Linggal

Geographical location
Geographically, the meaning of Apo Kayan can be understood as plateau that is located at the North Kalimantan-Sarawak boundary. Including Kayan Hulu district, Malinau Regency, North Kalimantan, Indonesia, this region has a height between 450 and 1,700 meters above sea levels.

Culture
The uniqueness of the Apo Kayan Dayak community is their wearing of earrings and tattoos on the hands and feet of both men and women. According to the ancestral beliefs, the wearing of earrings separates men from animals. While the tattoos signifies the difference in social rankings. According to them, the more tattoo markings are found on the body meant the higher the social status in the society would be. However, today the tradition of wearing earrings and tattoos are slowly being left out by the younger generation of the Apo Kayan people. This is due to the feeling of embarrassment to uphold such practices in today's modern society.

References 

Ethnic groups in Indonesia
Ethnic groups in Malaysia